The Chongqing Natural History Museum is a natural history museum in Chongqing, China.

The museum founded in 1944, originally as the Western Museum of China. It changed its name in 1981. The museum has a collection of about 70,000 specimens covering animals, minerals, paleontology, plants, and Stone Age period wares. It includes several dinosaur skeletons from the Sichuan Province. especially since the 1970s from around Zigong. The exhibits include the skeletons of the Omeisaurus Zigongensis dinosaur and the Tuojiang stegosaur. The museum also publishes books on dinosaurs.

The original museum building was in the Beibei District. A new museum building in the Yuzhong District was under construction as of 2013, consisting of six exhibition halls and covering an area of 14.4 hectares.

See also
 List of museums in China

References

External links

 Museum website

1944 establishments in China
Museums established in 1944
Natural History Museum
Natural history museums in China
National first-grade museums of China